Cucullia argentina is a moth of the family Noctuidae. It is found from central Turkey throughout the Caucasus, Iraq, Iran, Turkmenistan, southern Russia, Kazakhstan and Afghanistan to Mongolia.

Adults are on wing from April to May and from July to August. There are two generations per year.

The larvae feed on the flowers of Artemisia species.

External links
Lepiforum.de

Cucullia
Moths described in 1787
Insects of Turkey
Moths of the Middle East
Taxa named by Johan Christian Fabricius